Puttemansia is a genus in the Tubeufiaceae family of fungi.

The genus name of Puttemansia is in honour of Arsène Puttemans (1873-1937), who was a Belgian-Brazilian botanist (Mycology) and plant pathologist, who taught Plant pathology (about Plant diseases) between 1903-1910 at Polytechnic School of the University of São Paulo. 
 
The genus was circumscribed by Paul Christoph Hennings in Hedwigia vol.41 (Issue 3)  [104] on page 112 in 1902.

References

External links
Puttemansia at Index Fungorum

Tubeufiaceae